Cassius Baloyi (born 5 November 1974) is a retired professional boxer. He held the IBF super featherweight title twice between 2006 and 2009.

Professional career
Known as "Mr. Shy Guy", Baloyi turned pro in 1994 and captured the Vacant IBF Super Featherweight Title in 2006 with a TKO win over Manuel Medina. He lost the title in his first defense to Gairy St Clair later in the year, but regained the title by defeating compatriot Mzonke Fana on 12 April 2008. His most recent defense in September 2008 was against Javier Osvaldo Alvarez, whom he knocked down three times on the way to a TKO victory. On 12 April 2008, Baloyi lost his title to Malcolm Klassen when the referee stopped the fight during the seventh round after Klassen overpowered Baloyi. After the fight it was reported that Baloyi was disappointed with his trainer. Baloyi has retired from professional boxing and is now a Pro and Amateur boxing coach in Johannesburg.

Baloyi is the only South African to ever win six World Titles.
Baloyi was named "Boxer of the Year" for 2008 at the Boxing SA Annual Awards at a banquet held at Carnival City in Brakpan.

Boxing Academy
The Cassius Baloyi Boxing Academy was launched in January 2010 – a non-profit company dedicated to teaching boxing to underprivileged youths, particularly those living in Alexendra. The academy is affiliated with Sanabo and the local Boxing Committee JABO. Cassius is also training non fighters who enjoy the cardio element and rewards of training like boxers.

Professional boxing record

See also 
List of boxing triple champions

References

External links
Official web site
 

1974 births
Living people
People from Collins Chabane Local Municipality
Tsonga people
Southpaw boxers
International Boxing Federation champions
South African male boxers
Super-featherweight boxers
Sportspeople from Limpopo